Phricotelus stelliger is a species of spider of the monotypic genus Phricotelus. It is endemic to Sri Lanka.

See also
 List of Mysmenidae species

References

Mysmenidae
Monotypic Araneomorphae genera
Endemic fauna of Sri Lanka
Spiders of Asia